Jeandré Rudolph (born 9 May 1994) is a South African rugby union player for the  in the Currie Cup and the Rugby Challenge. His regular position is eighth man or flanker.

References

South African rugby union players
Living people
1994 births
People from Roodepoort
Rugby union flankers
Rugby union number eights
Leopards (rugby union) players
Pumas (Currie Cup) players
Rugby union players from Gauteng
Bulls (rugby union) players
Cheetahs (rugby union) players
Free State Cheetahs players